Menachem Hacohen (born 26 July 1932) is an Israeli rabbi, writer, thinker and former politician. He headed the Religious Worker faction in the Histadrut trade union, was member of the Knesset for the Alignment between 1974 and 1988, and also served as chief rabbi of the Moshavim Movement and the Histadrut. Between 1997 and 2011 he held the post of rabbi of Romanian Jewry. His wife is Israeli historian Devorah Hacohen.

Biography
Born in Jerusalem during the Mandate era, Hacohen was educated in the Slabodka yeshiva, before being certified as a rabbi. He began his military service in 1951 in the Nahal brigade, and held the post of chief editor of the Army Rabbi's publications from 1951 until 1955. Between 1952 and 1954 he also served as the Religious Ceremonies Officer in the General Staff. He went on to work as a rabbi in the navy from 1955 until 1956.

In 1967 he became the rabbi of the Moshavim Movement, before serving as the Histadrut's rabbi from 1968 until 1979. While serving as rabbi of the Moshavim, he met the Lubavitcher Rebbe, Rabbi Menachem Mendel Schneerson, who gave him four Torah Scrolls as a donation. In 1973 he was elected to the Knesset. He was re-elected in 1977, 1981 and 1984, before losing his seat in the 1988 elections.

Hacohen has also written several books, including The Stones Speak: History and Folklore about the Holy Places Liberated by the IDF (1967), Book of the Life of Man: Weddings (1986), Book of the Life of Man: Birth (1991), The Belief of a Nation (1996) and From Year to Year (1996).

He is also interested in interfaith dialogue, and currently sits on the Board of World Religious Leaders for The Elijah Interfaith Institute.

References

External links

1932 births
Chief rabbis of Romania
Rabbis in Jerusalem
Jews in Mandatory Palestine
Israeli rabbis
Israeli non-fiction writers
Living people
Israel Defense Forces rabbis
Alignment (Israel) politicians
Members of the 8th Knesset (1974–1977)
Members of the 9th Knesset (1977–1981)
Members of the 10th Knesset (1981–1984)
Members of the 11th Knesset (1984–1988)